is a passenger railway station located in the town of Misaki, Sennan District, Osaka Prefecture, Japan, operated by the private railway operator Nankai Electric Railway. It has the station number "NK42".

Lines

Layout
The station consists of two opposed side platforms connected by a level crossing. The station is unattended.

Platforms

Adjacent stations

History
Kyōshi Station opened on as a temporary stopping 1910 and was made a full passenger station on April 11, 1915.

Passenger statistics
In fiscal 2019, the station was used by an average of 115 passengers daily.

Surrounding area
Misaki History Museum

See also
 List of railway stations in Japan

References

External links

  

Railway stations in Japan opened in 1915
Railway stations in Osaka Prefecture
Misaki, Osaka